The Belgian Super Cup is an annual Rugby Union match contested between the winners of the Belgian Elite League and the Belgian Cup. The match is held in September of the following season as the opener to the new season.

History 

The competition was founded in 2009 and has been held four times. Royal Kituro are the only team to have won it more than once. The highest scoring game to date was the 2011 final when Royal Kituro beat Boitsfort RC 23-22.

Winners

References

Rugby union competitions in Belgium
2009 establishments in Belgium